Barcelonès is the most economically important comarca (county) of Catalonia, Spain. It contains Barcelona, which is the capital of Catalonia and of Barcelonès, and four adjacent inner suburbs. Notwithstanding, the comarca does not have a governing comarcal council; it was dissolved in 2017.

Municipalities

References

External links
 Official web site (in Catalan)

 
Comarques of the Province of Barcelona